The Winter Album may refer to:

 The Winter Album (NSYNC album)
 The Winter Album (The Brilliant Green album)

See also 
 Winter (disambiguation)#Albums